The Grupo Especial de Operaciones (GEO, ; , GEO), is the police tactical unit of Spain's National Police Corps. The GEO has response capabilities and is responsible for VIP protection duties, as well as countering and responding to terrorism. Organized along the lines of many other police tactical units throughout Europe, the GEOs is focused on dealing with terrorist attacks, including aircraft hijackings as well as maritime threats and hostage taking. The GEO can also be used in a support role for Spanish Police operations outside the realm of terrorism, and is active in protecting visiting heads of state and providing security for high-profile events such as the 1992 Summer Olympics held in Barcelona. The GEO is a member of the ATLAS Network, that includes all the national police tactical units of European Union countries and some countries outside the European Union.

History
With the intention of fighting against terrorism and several organized crime groups from Spain in the 1970s, in November 1977 the third section of Spanish military staff announced for members of the Policía Nacional vacancies which could be accessed freely for the newly formed Grupo Especial de Operaciones. The first training course began in March 1978.

A select group who had been months before in the GSG 9 base in San Agustín del Guadalix was selected to train this new unit. Colonel Ulrich Wegener, along with some members of his unit, took care of the equipment, the training and techniques which this new special unit in Spain would use.

The first access course of the GEO ended on 19 January 1979, with a ceremony attended by Juan Carlos I and Queen Sofía of Spain. On 23 February of that year, the unit was announced to the press.

Its first planned operation took place at Madrid Barajas International Airport in August 1978 but they did not have to enter into action because the conflict was solved before their arrival. The GEO's first action took place in Bilbao, 7 February 1981, in which five hostages were freed from two armed criminals in a branch office of the bank then known as Banco Bilbao Vizcaya. None of the criminals, hostages or police officers were hurt during the mission.

GEO was responsible for rescuing Dr. Iglesias Puga, father of singer Julio Iglesias as well as foiling an attempt by ETA to attack the 1992 Summer Olympics in Barcelona. Aside from that, the GEO has disarmed several organized crime groups, arrested forty-one armed members of different terrorist groups, freed 424 persons who had been kidnapped or taken as hostages and boarded twenty ships used to carry narcotics to seize their load and arrest their crew.

During the 27 years, it has been active, five members of the GEO have died. The unit has had only one casualty in combat, which occurred during the assault on the Leganés flat where the suspected perpetrators of the Madrid train bombings of 11 March 2004 were hiding. Having realized that they were trapped, the terrorists detonated bombs in the flat killing themselves and GEO Subinspector Francisco Javier Torronteras Gadea. This fatality was probably caused by the fact that the agents who entered the flat didn't know that the terrorists could have explosives.

As of 2005, the GEO was having problems with the number of members, which was below the necessary quantity. This meant that riot control units had to be sent to guard the Spanish embassy in Baghdad instead of GEO members, as originally intended.

On 17 August 2017, an unconfirmed amount of GEO operators were sent to Barcelona after the ramming of multiple people in the Cataluna section of the city.

Organization

The GEO reports to the General Operative Subdirector of the Cuerpo Nacional de Policía and its commander is a police superintendent. Its 110 members are divided into an Operative Section and a Support one.

GEO's Operative Section is formed by two Operative Action teams, a group of Training and Specialities and a Techniques and Experiences team. The action teams are called 40 and 50 and are under the command of an inspector.

Each group, led by a Subinspector, is split into two subgroups formed by three operative commandos of five men each. Every operative commando includes two snipers, a lock picking specialist, an explosives expert, a combat diver and a special environment technician.

The Training and Specialities operative team features the instructors of the training and refresher courses. The Techniques and Experiences team tests new equipment and looks for new possible terrorist objectives.

Administrative, medical and transport personnel act as members of the Support Section. The vehicles of the GEO depend on this section.

Access and training
Joining the GEO is accomplished by approximately 3% of the candidates every year. To join the GEO it is necessary to have been a member of the Cuerpo Nacional de Policía for two years, and to have at least one of the following skills: expertise in a martial art, scuba diving, being a marksmanship instructor, is an explosives expert and having worked in one of the operative groups the Police has in some province capitals.

The trial features both physical fitness and psychological tests. Its physical fitness test includes arm flexions on a bar, vertical jump, an obstacle course, running three kilometers in eleven minutes and a half, fifty meters of freestyle swimming, a strength test, a speed race and the last challenge which tests the candidates' decision-making capacity. On the psychological and intelligence test the mental capabilities of the candidates are checked.

Specialization
After having passed the access trial, GEO potential members go through a specialization course in Guadalajara which is not passed by all candidates.

There are four areas that candidates must master: instrumental, juridical, socio-professional, and police sciences and techniques. Police science and technique features high-speed and off-road driving, lock picking techniques, abseiling and climbing techniques, maneuvers with helicopters, transmissions, explosives and knowledge about terrorist groups. Instrumental area deals with physical aptitudes such as marksmanship, obstacle courses, martial arts, physical fitness, swimming, sniping, diving, and proficiency with motorcycles. The remaining areas are focused on the rights of terrorist groups and exchanging experience with members of similar groups of other countries.

Equipment
The uniform of the GEO includes: anorak, jacket, sweater, t-shirt, pants, boots and beret. Overalls are used as a complementary clothing piece. During summer, GEO members use a short-sleeved shirt instead of the sweater and the jacket.

Aside from their uniform, GEO members use protective gear which features helmets, Bolle Commando protective goggles, balaclava, Draeger gas mask, ballistic vest, Safariland sheaths for SIG P226 and gloves.
 
They also use vision-enhancing devices such as MATIS thermographic cameras, daylight thermographic cameras, binoculars, PalMIr 250 night vision cameras, Philips BM8028A1 binocular night vision goggles, ITT AN/AVS-9 binocular night vision goggles, ITT Pocket F6010 night vision visor and laser rangefinders.

To communicate between them they use the Matra SIRDEE (Sistema Integral de Radiodifusión Encriptada del Estado), Motorola MXR-1000 and MXR-2000 models and VHF/UHF portable repeaters.

For operations underwater they use other special gear. It includes: neoprene suits, dry suits for dives in contaminated water, "twin-hose" and "single-hose" open-circuit scubas, dive computers, underwater robots for dives up to 200 meters and dive support equipment.

The vehicles used include cars and bikes, special boats, Police helicopters and CH-47 Chinook heavy helicopters of the Spanish Army.

Weapons
The most common sniper rifles used by the group are the Mauser SP66, Heckler & Koch PSG1, AMP DSR-1, Sako TRG-41 and TRG-21, SAKO A-II (silenced) and Heckler & Koch G3SG/1. Their assault rifles are the SG 551 SWAT and SG 552, Heckler & Koch G41TGS and HK33. They use Franchi, Remington and Heckler & Koch shotguns. MP5 and FN P90 are the submachine guns of choice. Their pistols are the SIG P226 (9×19mm Parabellum) and the USP Compact. GEO members also employ electroshock weapons, which caused some controversy when Amnesty International denounced the use of such weapons by the Policía Nacional.

To increase shooting accuracy they employ shooting support devices such as the holographic weapon sight, AMT reflex sights, Schmidt & Bender 1.5 – 6 x 42 daylight sights, Simrad KN250F night vision sights, Zeiss Diavari daylight sights, Varo AN/PVS-4 night vision sights, EDS laser sights and Sure-Fire flashlights.

Notes

Bibliography

External links 
 Grupo Especial de Operaciones website

ATLAS Network
Law enforcement in Spain
Non-military counterterrorist organizations
Police tactical units